Westford is a town in Otsego County, New York, United States. The population was 868 at the 2010 census. It is southeast of Cooperstown.

History 
The town was first settled around 1790 by pioneers from Vermont. However, it is claimed that the first settler in Westford was Robert Roseboom from New Jersey, who settled in what is now known at Maple Valley. During the 1790s Westford received an influx of land-hungry settlers from New England who subsequently established the first churches and schools in Westford.

The town was established from part of the town of Worcester in 1808.

Geography

Elk Creek drains the town, flowing southward. Cherry Creek in Cherry Creek Valley flows through the southwestern part of Westford.

Demographics

As of the census of 2000, there were 784 people, 306 households, and 215 families residing in the town.  The population density was 23.2 people per square mile (9.0/km2).  There were 446 housing units at an average density of 13.2 per square mile (5.1/km2).  The racial makeup of the town was 98.09% White, 0.26% African American, 0.13% Asian, 0.38% Pacific Islander, 0.13% from other races, and 1.02% from two or more races. Hispanic or Latino of any race were 1.91% of the population.

There were 306 households, out of which 30.4% had children under the age of 18 living with them, 55.9% were married couples living together, 8.5% had a female householder with no husband present, and 29.7% were non-families. 23.5% of all households were made up of individuals, and 10.1% had someone living alone who was 65 years of age or older.  The average household size was 2.56 and the average family size was 3.00.

In the town, the population was spread out, with 25.5% under the age of 18, 6.6% from 18 to 24, 26.1% from 25 to 44, 26.7% from 45 to 64, and 15.1% who were 65 years of age or older.  The median age was 40 years. For every 100 females, there were 99.0 males.  For every 100 females age 18 and over, there were 96.6 males.

The median income for a household in the town was $34,318, and the median income for a family was $38,611. Males had a median income of $29,375 versus $22,237 for females. The per capita income for the town was $16,351.  About 6.8% of families and 9.2% of the population were below the poverty line, including 8.0% of those under age 18 and 13.2% of those age 65 or over.

Communities and locations in Westford 
Badeau Hill – An elevation located southwest of Westford.
Bentley Hollow – A former location in Westford.
Betty and Wilbur Davis State Park – The state park is in the northwestern part of the town.
Darling Hill – An elevation located west of Westford.
Elk Creek – An important stream flowing out the south of the town.
Hooker Mountain Wildlife Management Area – A conservation area in the southwestern part of town.
Hubbard Settlement – A former location in Westford.
Maple Valley – A hamlet in the northern part of Westford on County Road 34.
Westford – The hamlet of Westford is near the center of the town.
Westville – A hamlet at the junction of County Roads 35 and 42 by the western town line.

References

External links
 Town of Westford
  Early map and brief history of Westford

Towns in Otsego County, New York